Iron Nation (February 1815—November 15, 1894) was a principal chief of the Lower Brulé Lakota. He was one of the signers of the September 17, 1851 Treaty of Fort Laramie along with people from Lakota, Cheyenne, Arapaho, and other tribes. He also signed the October 14, 1865 treaty at Fort Sully with other Lakota chiefs, which established the Lower Brule Indian Reservation. A state historic marker near the Lower Brule Agency reads:
On October 14, 1865, at Fort Sully (5 miles E of Pierre) the Lower Brule Band by Iron Nation, White Buffalo Cow, Little Pheasant and 12 others, signed a treaty. It differed from the others signed there in that it set up a reservation 20 miles long and 10 back from the river between White River and Fort Lookout. The 1,800 Lower Brules were to get $6,000 a year and families who went to farming were to get $25.00 bonus. In 1866, they planted some acreage and to their great surprise got 2,000 bushels of grain.
Chief Iron Nation signed the 1868 Treaty at Fort Laramie in Wyoming which eliminated U.S. forts along the Bozeman Trail in Montana and established the Great Sioux Reservation.

Chief Iron Nation also signed the Black Hills agreement in September 1876. U.S. government agents went to the various Indian agencies to obtain signatures signing away Lakota rights to the Black Hills (Lakota: Paha Sapa), which the Lakota consider sacred.

The Black Hills had been guaranteed to the Lakota by the 1868 treaty signed at Ft. Laramie, but this was before gold was found, which resulted in the Black Hills Gold Rush.

Chief Iron Nation died of pneumonia at his home on the Sioux Reservation November 15, 1894.

The South Dakota Department of Tribal Government Relations website notes, "He has been described as a just and noble leader." He was inducted into the South Dakota Hall of Fame in 2006.

An 1867 photograph of Iron Nation by Alexander Gardner is held in the collections of the Princeton University Library.

Two members of the Lower Brule Sioux Tribe produced a 12-minute animated film about Iron Nation in 1997.

References

External links 
 Iron Nation (1997, 12 min. Animation) US. Producer: Alfreda Beartrack (Lower Brule Sioux), Director: Alfred Beartrack (Lower Brule Sioux)
 Photos of Chief Iron Nation

Brulé people
Native American people of the Indian Wars
Lakota leaders
1815 births
1894 deaths
People from South Dakota